Dance, Dance, Dance: The Best of Chic is a greatest hits album of recordings by American R&B band Chic, released by Atlantic Records/Warner Music in 1991. The compilation covers the hits and best-known album tracks from the band's early career, 1977–1979, with the addition of 1982 track "Soup for One". (Note: the version used is the edited 7" version, the cover incorrectly lists the timing of the 12" mix.)

Track listing
All tracks written by Bernard Edwards and Nile Rodgers unless otherwise noted.
"Dance, Dance, Dance (Yowsah, Yowsah, Yowsah)" (Edwards, Rodgers, Lehman) - 8:30
 From 1977 album Chic
"Everybody Dance" (12" Mix) - 8:25
 Original version appears on 1977 album Chic
"Strike Up the Band"  (Edwards, Lehman, Rodgers) - 5:10
 From 1977 album Chic
"Chic Cheer"  - 4:42
 From 1978 album C'est Chic
"Le Freak" – 5:23
 From 1978 album C'est Chic
"I Want Your Love"  - 6:45
 From 1978 album C'est Chic
"Good Times"  - 8:13
 From 1979 album Risqué
"My Feet Keep Dancing"  - 6:46
 From 1979 album Risqué
"My Forbidden Lover"   - 4:42
 From 1979 album Risqué
"Soup for One" (NB: 7" Edit. Listed as - 7:58, the timing of the 12" mix) - 3:07
 Original version appears on 1982 soundtrack album Soup For One
"Savoir Faire"  - 5:01
 From 1978 album C'est Chic

Production
 Bernard Edwards - producer for Chic Organization Ltd.
 Nile Rodgers - producer for Chic Organization Ltd.
 Kenny Lehman - co-producer (tracks 1 & 3)

Certifications

References

Chic (band) compilation albums
Albums produced by Nile Rodgers
Albums produced by Bernard Edwards
1991 greatest hits albums
Atlantic Records compilation albums